Stadionul Dumitru Mătărău is a multi-use stadium in Ștefăneștii de Jos, Romania. It is used mostly for football matches and was the home ground of CS Ștefănești and Unirea Tărlungeni. Temporarily here played Sportul Snagov, team whose stadium was under renovation. The stadium holds 1,200 people.

References

Football venues in Romania
Buildings and structures in Ilfov County